Antonio Flores Rodríguez, nicknamed El Niño  (13 July 1923 — 16 May 2001) was a Mexican football midfielder who played for Mexico in the 1950 FIFA World Cup.

Club career
He also played for Club Atlas.

References

External links
 
FIFA profile

1923 births
2001 deaths
Association football midfielders
Mexican footballers
Mexico international footballers
1950 FIFA World Cup players
Atlas F.C. footballers
CD Oro footballers